John Adams (born May 5, 1954) is an American professional golfer.

Adams was born in Altus, Oklahoma and went to college at Arizona State.

Adams finished runner-up on the PGA Tour on two occasions, including a playoff loss to Jay Haas at the 1982 Hall of Fame.

Adams finished tied for 11th at the 1993 U.S. Open, his best major finish.

Playoff record
PGA Tour playoff record (0–1)

Results in major championships

Note: Adams never played in The Open Championship.

CUT = missed the half-way cut
"T" indicates a tie for a place

See also
1972 PGA Tour Qualifying School graduates
1978 PGA Tour Qualifying School graduates (Spring)
1979 PGA Tour Qualifying School graduates (Fall)
1985 PGA Tour Qualifying School graduates
1988 PGA Tour Qualifying School graduates
1994 PGA Tour Qualifying School graduates

External links

American male golfers
Arizona State Sun Devils men's golfers
PGA Tour golfers
Golfers from Oklahoma
People from Altus, Oklahoma
1954 births
Living people